Allspark, formerly known as Hasbro Studios, LLC, was an American production and distribution company located in Burbank, California. It was a wholly owned subsidiary of the American toy and multimedia company Hasbro. Originally just a TV production division, many of its TV shows were based on Hasbro properties and were broadcast on multiple media platforms, including Discovery Family.

Allspark Pictures was Allspark's live-action production label, while Allspark Animation was its animation production label. Cake Mix Studio was the company's Rhode Island-based producer of commercials and short form content.

Following Hasbro's acquisition of Entertainment One on December 30, 2019, the production & distribution of film and television content based on Hasbro properties is now being managed by the acquired company under the leadership of Darren Throop, president of family brands Olivier Dumont, and former HBO head of programming Michael Lombardo. As a result, Allspark was absorbed into Entertainment One. However, in late-2022, Hasbro announced their intent to sell eOne, a transaction that would place the distribution rights to the Allspark library and newer content back to Hasbro.

Background 
In the early 1980s, when Hasbro began creating animated series based on their properties, they hired Sunbow Productions, who was already producing commercials for them, to create such series as G.I. Joe and The Transformers which would be syndicated by Hasbro's Claster Television subsidiary. In May 2008, Hasbro reacquired the Sunbow-produced animated series based on their properties from TV-Loonland AG for $7 million. The funds would help TV-Loonland AG (the owner of the Sunbow catalogue) to pay off its debts, and for Hasbro to create programs in-house.

History

Hasbro Studios (2009–2019) 

Hasbro Studios was founded in 2009 for TV development, production and distribution, with Stephen J. Davis as president. On October 10, 2010, Hasbro Studios and Discovery Communications relaunched the channel formerly known as Discovery Kids as The Hub (Now known as Discovery Family). On November 9, 2010, Hasbro Studios signed an agreement with Canadian media company Corus Entertainment to broadcast their productions on YTV and Teletoon. On October 6, 2011, Hasbro Studios signed an agreement with seven US and international airlines, such as Continental Airlines and Qantas, to broadcast shows on their planes. In March 2012, the studio started venturing into foreign co-productions starting with Play-Doh (DoPei Le Doh), mixed animation and live action series with Toonmax, part of the Shanghai Media Group.

In December 2012, Hasbro transferred all entertainment divisions to Hasbro Studios, including their Los Angeles-based film group, and Cake Mix Studio, the company's Rhode Island-based producer of commercials and short form content. On February 28, 2013, the studio laid off three staffers in its Game & Reality Show Production & Development department, which was moved under vice president Kevin Belinkoff along with the animation department's management and outside creative consultants.

In August 2014, Josh Feldman was appointed as head of development for Hasbro Studios, as he will oversee live-action and TV series. On October 20, the studio announced the new film finance production label Allspark Pictures.

Hasbro Studios released its first non-soundtrack album, Truly Outrageous: A Tribute to Starlight Records, with Legacy Recordings on August 7, 2015. This promotion album for Jem film consisted of remakes of classic Jem TV series songs.

On December 15, 2015, Hasbro Studios and Paramount Pictures have signed a deal to create a  five-property movie universe  produced by Hasbro's Allspark Pictures and distributed by Paramount Pictures. The properties in this movie-verse are G.I. Joe, Micronauts, Visionairies, M.A.S.K. and Rom.

After two attempted films for Stretch Armstrong, the property was picked up by Netflix in January 2016 for a full order as a 26-episode animated series, making it the first deal between the company and the streaming service. By March 2017, Hasbro Studios' executive staff and its animation and toy prototyping teams moved to the Burbank office building. In 2017, Hasbro Studios launched its first franchise through YouTube called Hanazuki: Full of Treasures.

On November 3, 2017, Hasbro Studios and Paramount extended their relationship, with an exclusive five year production deal for Allspark Pictures and Allspark Animation to create original and franchise-based films. Both Allspark units were newly formed (Allspark Pictures was formerly a film finance label), with the film unit led by Greg Mooradian and the animation unit led by Meghan McCarthy. Paramount and Hasbro would also work together on TV series.

With the loss of the Jurassic Park license in 2016, Hasbro launched a new dinosaurs based franchise, its second new studio property, with its Chomp Squad animated series on January 6, 2018. On May 1, 2018, Hasbro announced that they were acquiring Power Rangers and other entertainment assets from Saban Capital Group, which was completed on June 12, 2018. At the time, Power Rangers was renewed for three more seasons until 2021, and the animated series Treehouse Detectives had nearly two seasons produced.

Allspark (2019–2020) 
On March 26, 2019, Stephen Davis announced that Hasbro Studios would be rebranded as "Allspark", named after the fictional artifact featured in the Transformers franchise.

On May 7, 2019, Allspark and Boulder Media announced a new feature animation studio. The companies had bid on an old ferry terminal for the studio, but were turned down by the Dún Laoghaire-Rathdown County Council in previous attempts.

On December 30, 2019, Hasbro completed the acquisition of the Canadian entertainment company Entertainment One.

Entertainment One era (2020–2023) 
On October 9, 2020, eOne took over as Hasbro's new production arm and began development and distribution of content based on Hasbro properties from the toy company, resulting in Allspark being absorbed into the acquired company.

On August 22, 2022, Bloomberg reported that Hasbro was seeking to sell or restructure its media assets, including eOne, On the same day Darren Throop was announced to be stepping down as the company's CEO by the end of the year. On November 1, 2022, Hasbro sold Boulder Media to Australian media company Princess Pictures.

On November 17, 2022, Hasbro announced they were putting the entirety of Entertainment One up for sale, including all of their non-Hasbro assets ranging from scripted and unscripted television and films, but would exclude the company's ex-children's properties, which were already consolidated under Hasbro. Four months later, it was reported that  Fremantle, Lionsgate and Legendary Entertainment are interested in the buyout.

Allspark Pictures 

Allspark Pictures, formerly Hasbro Films, or Hasbro Film Group, was a film production within Allspark, a subsidiary of Hasbro tasked with developing films for Hasbro properties.

In 1986, The Transformers: The Movie and My Little Pony: The Movie, animated theatrical films based on Hasbro properties, were released. Waddingtons, later purchased by Hasbro in 1994, Clue's US licensee, licensed a Clue film, released in 1985. Hasbro had previously licensed Transformers to DreamWorks for a live action film released in 2007. The Transformers franchise continued solely with Paramount Pictures, the distribution of and acquirer of DreamWorks, with the addition of the G.I. Joe property.

Hasbro and Universal Pictures signed an agreement in February 2008 to derive and produce four films from seven Hasbro properties: Battleship, Candy Land, Clue, Magic: The Gathering, Monopoly, Ouija, and Stretch Armstrong. Hasbro was to pay for all development costs for the films and Universal was supposed to pay $5 million per property not made into films. In May, Bennett Schneir was hired to lead its film division while Hasbro also reacquired animated series based on their properties from Sunbow Productions.

By January 2012, all Hasbro properties at Universal — except for Battleship and Ouija — were halted in development. While Hasbro's film division continued to have an office on the Universal lot, Hasbro was able to take the Universal agreement properties to any studio. Universal paid a multimillion-dollar fee instead of the $5 million per property to depart from the agreement.

On 31 January 2012, it was announced that Columbia Pictures, Happy Madison, and Adam Sandler were in final negotiations to develop the Candy Land film. In February, Stretch Armstrong was set up with Relativity Media. In October, Hasbro signed a three picture co-production two-year deal which includes a first look provision with Emmett/Furla for Monopoly, Action Man, and Hungry Hungry Hippos, with Envision Entertainment's partners Stepan Martisoyan and Remington Chase as co-financiers. In December, Hasbro transferred the feature films division into Hasbro Studios along with its other short film division. By October 10, 2013, Relativity and Hasbro had removed the Stretch Armstrong movie from their schedules.

Hasbro filed suit against Sweetpea Entertainment and Warner Bros. on May 12, 2013 regarding the announced Dungeons & Dragons (D&D) movie based on Chainmail. Hasbro had asserted that rights had reverted to Hasbro, while Sweetpea felt they had the rights under a 1994 agreement with TSR. Hasbro had reportedly just agreed to license D&D movie rights to Universal. On August 3, 2015, Warner Bros. announced that they will be developing a Dungeons & Dragons movie as a resolution to the lawsuit. The film will be based on the Forgotten Realms campaign world with Courtney Solomon and Roy Lee producing, David Leslie Johnson writing the screenplay, and produced by Sweetpea Entertainment and Allspark Pictures.

In January 2014, Hasbro announced a franchise film deal with 20th Century Fox for Magic: The Gathering by its subsidiary Wizards of the Coast. In October 2014, the studio announced its film self-finance/co-finance label Allspark Pictures with its first existing project Jem and the Holograms, along with My Little Pony: The Movie.

Hasbro's first original film project, Hacker Camp, was assigned to writer Tripper Clancy in February 2015. By July 2015, the Monopoly satire film with Emmett/Furla was set aside with Hasbro announcing that Lionsgate will distribute a Monopoly film with Andrew Niccol writing the film as a family-friendly action adventure film co-financed and produced by Lionsgate and Hasbro's Allspark Pictures.

Films' parent unit, Hasbro Studios, on December 15, 2015 agreed with Paramount Pictures to a deal creating a five-property movie universe by financing unit Allspark Pictures and distributed by Paramount Pictures. The properties in this movie-verse are G.I. Joe, Micronauts, Visionaries, M.A.S.K. and Rom. A writers’ room was organized to develop a "creative roadmap". On April 21, 2016, The Hollywood Reporter has reported that Michael Chabon, Brian K. Vaughan, Nicole Perlman, Lindsey Beer, Cheo Coker, John Francis Daley & Jonathan Goldstein, Joe Robert Cole, Jeff Pinkner, Nicole Riegel and Geneva Robertson has joined the writers room.

On November 2, 2016, The Weinstein Company has announced that a Furby movie is in development as a live action/CG-animated movie produced under the TWC-Dimension label.

After two attempts to purchase or merge with a filmed entertainment company, DreamWorks Animation and Lionsgate, fell apart due to pricing differences, Hasbro Studios moved to create a full-fledged movie studio. Thus in October 2017, the company hired Greg Mooradian, currently working at Fox 2000, as president of Allspark Pictures starting January 2018. Variety's sources also indicated that the company was looking for financing for a while in the hundred million dollars range. By November 2017, a five-year exclusive distribution and production pact was signed between Hasbro and Paramount Pictures for Allspark Pictures and Allspark Animation films. Plus Meghan McCarthy was promoted to head up for Allspark Animation.

Filmography and discography

Television filmography

Animated television series (under Allspark Animation)

Animated web series

Live-action television series

Live-action game shows

Cinematic filmography

Feature-length films

Television films and specials

Discography

References

External links 

  (Now redirected to Entertainment One website)
 Hasbro Studios Shorts on YouTube

 
Entertainment One
Entertainment companies based in California
Defunct companies based in Greater Los Angeles
Defunct film and television production companies of the United States
2009 establishments in California
2020 disestablishments in California
American animation studios
American companies established in 2009
American companies disestablished in 2020
Companies based in Burbank, California
Mass media companies established in 2009
Mass media companies disestablished in 2020
Former Hasbro subsidiaries